Third wave may refer to:
 Third-wave feminism, diverse strains of feminist activity in the early 1990s
 Third wave ska, a musical genre
 Third Wave of the Holy Spirit, a 1980s expression coined by C. Peter Wagner for a Neocharismatic Christian movement
 Third wave of coffee, genesis and establishment of coffee growers, roasters and retailers focused on achieving the highest form of culinary appreciation of coffee
 Third Wave Democracy, third major surge of democracy in history

The Third Wave may refer to:
 The Third Wave (experiment), a name given by history teacher Ron Jones to an experimental recreation of Nazi Germany which he conducted with high school students
 The Third Wave (2003 film), a Swedish action film
 The Third Wave (2007 film), a documentary about the aftermath of the 2004 tsunami in Sri Lanka
 The Third Wave (2017 film), an Irish horror film directed by David Freyne and starring Elliot Page.
 The Third Wave (Toffler book), 1980 book by Alvin Toffler
 The Third Wave: Democratization in the Late Twentieth Century, 1991 book by Samuel P. Huntington
 The wave of acceptance and mindfulness-based forms of cognitive behavioral therapy such as Acceptance and commitment therapy or Mindfulness-based cognitive therapy
 The Third Wave, an album mixed by DJ's Scott Brown and Neophyte
 The Third Wave, an American-Philippine jazz vocal quintet discovered by George Duke
 The Third Wave of an Elliott wave sequence which is never the shortest and is usually the strongest wave of a five wave motive sequence.

Wave 3 may refer to:
WAVE (TV), a television station in Louisville, Kentucky, on channel number 3